A large round of regional elections in Italy took place on 28–29 March in 13 regions out of 20, including nine of the ten largest ones: Lombardy, Campania, Veneto, Lazio, Piedmont, Emilia-Romagna, Apulia, Tuscany and Calabria.

Overview
The elections turned out to be a competition between two rival coalitions built around the two major parties: The People of Freedom (PdL) of Silvio Berlusconi and the Democratic Party (PD) led by Pier Luigi Bersani. 
The third largest party in Italy, Northern League (whose main regional sections, Liga Veneta, Lega Lombarda and Lega Piemont playing a large role in Veneto, Lombardy and Piedmont, respectively) supported joint candidates with the PdL in Northern and Central Italy.
 
The centre-right went to win the elections by gaining four more regions than in 2005: Campania, Lazio, Piedmont and Calabria. The centre-left coalition won seven regions out of 13.

Lega Nord played a major role in the North, where it was the second-largest party and the largest in Veneto. The party led by Umberto Bossi managed to have two of its leading members elected at the head of a region: in Piedmont and in Veneto.

Beppe Grillo's Five Star Movement, a protest party popular, had a strong showing in Emilia-Romagna.

Overall results

Regional councils

Presidents of the regions

Results by region

Piedmont

Lombardy

Veneto

Liguria

Emilia-Romagna

Tuscany

Umbria

Marche

Lazio

Campania

Basilicata

Apulia

Calabria

Sources: Ministry of the Interior – Historical Archive of Elections, Corriere della Sera and La Repubblica

Further reading

External links
Sondaggi politico elettorali – opinion polls
Il Clandestino – analysis and opinion polls
Scenari politici – analysis and opinion polls

Elections in Italian regions
2010 elections in Italy
March 2010 events in Italy